Winterton-Horsey Dunes is a  biological and geological Site of Special Scientific Interest north of Great Yarmouth in Norfolk. It is a Special Area of Conservation and a Nature Conservation Review site, Grade I. Winterton Dunes is a National Nature Reserve  Winterton Ness is a Geological Conservation Review site. The whole site is in the Norfolk Coast Area of Outstanding Natural Beauty.

This site has extensive dunes together with areas of grazing marsh and birch woodland. Invertebrates include a rare amphibian and a rare butterfly. The site is geologically important as it displays the processes which control dynamic dune development.

The beach is open to the public.

References

Sites of Special Scientific Interest in Norfolk
[[CategoryNational nature reserves in England
Nature Conservation Review sites
Ramsar sites in England
Special Protection Areas in England
Special Areas of Conservation in England
Geological Conservation Review sites]]